St Catherine's College Boat Club (SCCBC) is the rowing club of St Catherine's College, Oxford. Established in 1875 as St. Catharine's Boat Club, the club first took part in Torpids and Summer Eights in 1876. Notable people associated with the club include British Olympic gold medallists Matthew Pinsent and Andrew Triggs Hodge and silver medallist Colin Smith.

History
In 1868 the University established a society for non-Collegiate students, members of which in 1874 founded St. Catharine's Club; from this sprang St. Catharine's Boat Club (SCBC) in 1875. In 1919 the Boat Club changed the spelling to St. Catherine.  The Boat Club became the SCCBC. In Oxford, SCCBC first took part in Torpids and Summer Eights in 1876.

Notable members
The club achieved its first Blue in 1967 and first women Blues in 1976. Crews have participated in regattas, starting with an entry for the Wyfold Cup at Henley Royal Regatta in 1883. International representation began with the Commonwealth Games in 1958, and since 1986 SCCBC men and women have filled places in national crews. 

Matthew Pinsent was the first Olympic Gold associated with the club, winning at the 1992 Summer Olympics. Since then, British Olympic gold medallist Andrew Triggs Hodge, and silver medallist Colin Smith have rowed for the college.

References

External links
 Official website

Rowing clubs of the University of Oxford
Boat club
1875 establishments in England
Sports clubs established in 1875
Rowing clubs in Oxfordshire
Rowing clubs of the River Thames